Ecuador is competing at the 2013 World Aquatics Championships in Barcelona, Spain between 19 July and 4 August 2013. Ecuador, suspended by FINA, participated under the FINA flag as independent athletes.

Open water swimming

Ecuador qualified four quota places for the following events in open water swimming.

Swimming

Ecuadorian swimmers achieved qualifying standards in the following events (up to a maximum of 2 swimmers in each event at the A-standard entry time, and 1 at the B-standard):

Men

Women

References

External links
Barcelona 2013 Official Site
FEN web site 

Nations at the 2013 World Aquatics Championships
2013 in Ecuadorian sport
Ecuador at the World Aquatics Championships
FINA Independent athletes